Chengzhong District is one of four districts of Liuzhou, Guangxi Zhuang Autonomous Region, China.

Administrative divisions
Chengzhong District is divided into 7 subdistricts:

Subdistricts:
Chengzhong Subdistrict (城中街道), Gongyuan Subdistrict (公园街道), Zhongnan Subdistrict (中南街道), Shuishang Subdistrict (水上街道), Tanzhong Subdistrict (潭中街道), Hedong Subdistrict (河东街道), Jinglan Subdistrict (静兰街道)

References

External links

County-level divisions of Guangxi
Liuzhou